6-Fluoro-N,N-dimethyltryptamine (6-Fluoro-DMT) is a synthetic drug of the tryptamine chemical class.

Pharmacology

Binding profile 

6-Fluoro-DMT possess affinity for the 5-HT1A (392.6 nM), 5-HT1B (217.7 nM), 5-HT1D (55.4 nM), 5-HT1E (460.8 nM), 5-HT2A (866 nM), 5-HT2B (29.8 nM), 5-HT2C (674.2 nM), 5-HT5A (960.5 nM), 5-HT6 (25.6 nM), 5-HT7 (40.8 nM), D1 (547.3 nM), D2 (610.4 nM), D3 (866.8 nM), D4 (1,454 nM), D5 (6,291 nM), α1A-adrenergic (173.3 nM), α2B-adrenergic (295.5 nM), α2C-adrenergic (148.8 nM), H1 (46.6 nM), H2 (925.4 nM), I1 (898.4 nM), 1 (6,892 nM), and 2 (7,128 nM) receptors, as well as the SERT (144.6 nM). It has low/negligible (> 10,000 nM) affinity for the 5-HT3, α1B-adrenergic, α2A-adrenergic, β1-adrenergic, β2-adrenergic, H3, H4, and M1-M5 receptors, as well as the DAT and NET. It has not been screened at 5-HT1F, 5-HT4, α1D-adrenergic, β3-adrenergic, or VMAT1/VMAT2.

See also 
 5-Fluoro-DMT
 5-Fluoro-αMT
 5-Bromo-DMT
 6-Fluoro-AMT
 6-Fluoro-DET

References

External links 
 6-Fluoro-DET

Tryptamines